Lanphier High School, in the capital of the U.S. state of Illinois, Springfield, is a public high school affiliated with Springfield Public School District 186. It is also the home of the John Marshall Club, a club with open membership dedicated to uniting the community and spreading the knowledge of former supreme court justice, John Marshall.

History 
Originally, the land that the high school was built on was owned by the Lanphier family. Originally the land was a park called Reservoir Park, in which many people would go during the summer. After the park was sold to the school district, the actual building of the school became a part of the Works Progress Administration (WPA).

The first graduating class of the high school was in 1937.

The biggest expansion of the school was the absorption of Edison Junior High School. There was originally a walkway that connected the two schools. During the 1960s, the two buildings were combined to make the high school much larger. Some of the most recent modifications are the Commons Area, as well as additional classrooms on the West end of the school.

Notable alumni
 Kevin Gamble - NBA player for Boston Celtics
 Ed Horton - NBA player for the Washington Bullets
 Tim Hulett - MLB player for Chicago White Sox and Baltimore Orioles
 Andre Iguodala - NBA player, 4X NBA champion for Golden State Warriors and 2015 NBA Finals MVP
 Rome Flynn - actor in How to Get Away with Murder 
 Mike McKenna - NHL goaltender, drafted by Nashville Predators in sixth round of 2002 NHL Entry Draft; made NHL debut in 2009 with Tampa Bay Lightning
 Robin Roberts - pitcher for the Philadelphia Phillies, 7x All-Star and 4x MLB wins leader; member of Baseball Hall of Fame
 Russ Smith - producer of award-winning film Juno

References

Public high schools in Illinois
Works Progress Administration in Illinois
Schools in Springfield, Illinois